James K. Egan (1858 – September 26, 1884), nicknamed "Troy Terrier", was an American Major League Baseball player from New Haven, Connecticut who played one season as a pitcher and center fielder for the Troy Trojans of the National League in .  He played in a total of 30 games that season, 18 as an outfielder, and 12 as a pitcher.

Egan died in his hometown at the age of 26 of brain fever.

References

External links

Baseball players from New Haven, Connecticut
Major League Baseball pitchers
Major League Baseball center fielders
19th-century baseball players
Troy Trojans players
1858 births
1884 deaths
Brooklyn Grays (Interstate Association) players